The 1995–96 season was Port Vale's 84th season of football in the English Football League, and second successive season in the First Division. Despite a poor start to the season, John Rudge led his side to a twelfth-place finish. The league highlights were two derby wins over Stoke City, had these results gone the other way then Stoke would have won automatic promotion to the Premier League. Vale's excellent mid-season form also raised hopes of a promotion campaign, but they faded away at the final stages. In the FA Cup, Vale achieved a celebrated upset by knocking out holders Everton with a 2–1 win at Vale Park. They were then eliminated at the Fifth Round, after taking Leeds United to a replay. They reached the final of the Anglo-Italian Cup, where they were defeated 5–2 by Genoa. These successes did not translate to the League Cup, where Vale exited at the First Round. Key new signings were Lee Mills and Player of the Year Jon McCarthy, though it was established star Tony Naylor who was the club's top-scorer.

Overview

First Division
The pre-season saw John Rudge make three key signings. He bought Lee Mills from Derby County with Robin van der Laan going in the opposite direction with Vale receiving an additional £475,000; as well as Jon McCarthy from York City for a, still club record, £500,000; and defender Andy Hill from Manchester City for £200,000. He also signed Dutch defender Jermaine Holwyn from AFC Ajax for a £5,000 fee.

The season started terribly, as Vale won just one of their opening ten league games, failing to find the net in half of these fixtures. However the one win during this time was against the most important of opponents, rivals Stoke City at the Victoria Ground. The derby took place on 27 August, and a crowd of 14,283 witnessed Ian Bogie score the only goal of the game. Their win over Huddersfield Town at the Alfred McAlpine Stadium at the start of the October was also followed by a sequence of eight games without a win, leaving the club staring relegation in the face. In November, Canadian international defender Randy Samuel signed after impressing on trial, but soon was sidelined with a serious knee injury. Meanwhile, John Jeffers left the club for Stockport County. The Vale turned a corner in December, and would remain one of the division's form sides until April, losing just two league games in a run of nineteen games, picking up eleven wins. One of these wins was against Stoke, who left Burslem on 12 March with a 1–0 defeat. To Stoke, Bogie lived up to his name, as he scored his second league goal of the campaign in front of a Vale Park crowd of 16,737. Vale were facing the prospect of a promotion battle to reach the top-flight of English football, the Premier League, for the first time in their history. However just two wins came in the final ten games, leaving Vale to settle for a top-half finish.

They finished in twelfth place with sixty points, eleven points shy of Charlton Athletic in the play-off zone, and eight points clear of Millwall in the relegation zone. Tony Naylor was top-scorer with twelve goals in all competitions, closely followed by Martin Foyle, Andy Porter, and Jon McCarthy.

At the end of the season Kevin Kent retired, and took up a coaching role at the club. Young winger Craig Lawton had not established himself at Vale, and so was transferred to non-league Colwyn Bay. Randy Samuel was also permitted to leave for Norwegian club Harstad IL. Bradley Sandeman was another departing player, as he was given a free transfer to Rotherham United, whilst Lee Glover also joined the "Millers" for a £150,000 fee.

Finances
The club's shirt sponsors were Tunstall Assurance.

Cup competitions
In the FA Cup, Vale faced a difficult tie against Crystal Palace. After a goalless draw at Selhurst Park, the Vale advanced with a 4–3 win thanks to a brace from Ray Walker. They then faced the Premier League cup-holders Everton at Goodison Park. Foyle equalized after the "Toffees" scored the opener, and Ian Bogie saved the day with a deflected goal in injury time after Everton had again taken the lead through Duncan Ferguson. This goal saved the blushes of Foyle, who missed a sitter from six yards earlier in the game, and Paul Musselwhite, who gifted Ferguson his goal when he spilled Anders Limpar's cross. Back at Vale Park, the "Valiants" added another scalp to their collection with goals from Bogie and McCarthy to win the match 2–1. The club also took in their highest ever gate receipt total, as the game saw Vale bank £170,349. They then faced another top side away in the Fifth Round, Leeds United at Elland Road. A goalless draw raised hopes of another cup upset, and hopes turned to expectations as Naylor put Vale ahead in the replay. However two goals from Gary McAllister saved United's blushes, dumping Vale out of the cup. For their efforts, John Rudge's side were handed the FA's Giantkillers award for the season.

In the League Cup, Vale faced league rivals Huddersfield Town. Despite a 2–1 victory at the Alfred McAlpine Stadium, the "Terriers" escaped from Burslem with a 3–1 victory to knock Vale out of the competition.

In the Anglo-Italian Cup, Vale drew 2–2 with Cesena, beat Ancona 2–0, and drew 0–0 with Genoa, before beating Perugia 5–3. This took Vale through the Group Stage, along with Birmingham City, as they finished ahead of both Oldham Athletic and Luton Town. Facing Ipswich Town in the English semi-final, they progressed with a 4–2 win. They still had to beat West Bromwich Albion in a two-legged affair to reach the final. They beat the "Baggies" 3–1 to become the last English team in the competition, and face Genoa again, this time to decide the tournament's winner. Despite a brace from Foyle, the Serie B side were the 5–2 victors, former Italian international Gennaro Ruotolo scoring a hat-trick.

League table

Results
Port Vale's score comes first

Football League First Division

Results by matchday

Matches

FA Cup

League Cup

Player statistics

Appearances

Top scorers

Transfers

Transfers in

Transfers out

References
Specific

General
Soccerbase

Port Vale F.C. seasons
Port Vale